Hosken Powell (born May 14, 1955) is a former professional baseball player. He played from 1978 to 1983 for the Minnesota Twins and Toronto Blue Jays of Major League Baseball (MLB). He attended Chipola College, Marianna, Florida.

Career
Powell was selected by the Twins in the first round of the secondary phase of the June 1975 amateur draft.  He batted over .300 for his first three professional baseball seasons and was an All-Star in the Class A California League (1976), when he led the league in runs scored and batted .345.

He was in the Twins' lineup as the starting right fielder and lead-off man on Opening Day 1978, and went one for four in his debut game, with an infield hit off Glenn Abbott of the Seattle Mariners.  Powell started in 99 games in right field that season, but hit only .247 with little power.  In , he reached a career high in batting average, at .293, and started in 81 games — half the Twins' regular-season schedule. In , Powell appeared in 137 games, 118 as a starter, and had a career-high 127 hits, but his average fell to .262 and had only 28 extra-base hits, including six home runs.  He led American League right-fielders in errors with nine.

Strike-shortened  was Powell's last year with Minnesota. He appeared in 80 games, 65 as a starting player, and batted .239. He was traded to the Blue Jays on December 28. He returned to Vancouver for  a full season in 1984, but was not recalled by the Brewers, and he played his eleventh and final pro season in 1985 in the Mexican League.
 
Powell appeared in 594 games played over all or parts of six Major League seasons.  His 470 hits included 78 doubles, 17 triples and 17 home runs.  He batted .259 in 1,816 at bats.

References

External links

1955 births
Living people
African-American baseball players
American expatriate baseball players in Canada
American expatriate baseball players in Mexico
Baseball players from Alabama
Chipola Indians baseball players
Elizabethton Twins players
Major League Baseball right fielders
Minnesota Twins players
Reno Silver Sox players
San Diego Padres scouts
Saraperos de Saltillo players
Sportspeople from Selma, Alabama
Tacoma Twins players
Toronto Blue Jays players
Vancouver Canadians players
21st-century African-American people
20th-century African-American sportspeople